Anarchopanda is a giant panda and the unofficial mascot of the 2012 Quebec student protests, known for hugging both students and police officers. His first appearance was at a protest on May 8, 2012. He was portrayed by philosophy professor Julien Villeneuve at Montreal CEGEP Collège de Maisonneuve.

The Anarchopanda persona was discontinued in 2020 after Villeneuve was publicly accused of attempting sexual relations with a 16-year-old girl at his home in 2012, while she was inebriated and after she had repeatedly told him she wanted to leave. He initially responded on Facebook, saying "I am not a predator", but subsequently issued no response to the content of the allegations.

Julien Villeneuve 
Julien Villeneuve, who dressed in a panda costume to portray Anarchopanda, has a strong affinity for Plato, Aristotle and Plotinus. A self-described anarcho-pacifist, he tried to create a buffer between police and students to avoid violence "without betraying [the students'] struggle or co-opting their discourse".

References

External links

 
Anarchopanda on Facebook

Bear mascots
Student protests in Canada